is a district located in Tokachi Subprefecture, Hokkaido, Japan.

As of 2004, the district has an estimated population of 25,474 and a density of 25.91 persons per km2. The total area is 983.05 km2.

Towns and villages
Memuro
Nakasatsunai
Sarabetsu

History
1869 provinces and districts established in Hokkaido, Kasai District placed under Tokachi Province
April, 1906 Biman Village and Nishishihoro Village from Katō District and Memuro Village, Bisei Village (美生村) and Haobi Village from Kasai District merge to form Memuro Village (now Town) in Kasai District
September, 1920 Part of Memuro Village incorporated into Shimizu Village (now Town) in Kamikawa (Tokachi) District
April, 1926 Part of Makubetsu Village (now Town) in Kamikawa District incorporated into Taisho Village (now part of Obihiro City)
April 1, 1933 Obihiro Town becomes Obihiro City, leaving the district
April 1, 1948 Part of Makubetsu Town in Kamikawa District incorporated into Taisho and Sarabetsu Villages
September 30, 1956 Mikage Village incorporated into Shimizu Town in Kamikawa District
April 1, 1957 Kawanishi Village and Taisho Village incorporated into Obihiro City, leaving the district.

Districts in Hokkaido